The South Africa A cricket team toured England to play one first-class matches and three limited-overs matches against the England Lions. The Matches were played at Nottingham, Northampton and Canterbury from 1 June to 1 July 2017.

Squads

ODI Series

1st Unofficial ODI

2nd Unofficial ODI

3rd Unofficial ODI

Test Series

Only Unofficial Test

References

2017 in cricket